The 1875 Chicago White Stockings season was the 4th season of the Chicago White Stockings franchise, the 3rd and final in the National Association of Professional Base Ball Players and the 2nd at 23rd Street Grounds. The White Stockings finished sixth in the National Association with a record of 30–37.

Regular season

Season standings

Record vs. opponents

Roster

Player stats

Batting 
Note: G = Games played; AB = At bats; H = Hits; Avg. = Batting average; HR = Home runs; RBI = Runs batted in

Starting pitchers 
Note: G = Games pitched; IP = Innings pitched; W = Wins; L = Losses; ERA = Earned run average; SO = Strikeouts

References 
1875 Chicago White Stockings season at Baseball Reference

Chicago Cubs seasons
Chicago White Stockings Season, 1875
Chicago Cubs